MAPN may refer to:
Ministry of National Defense (Romania)
Medecins Aux Pieds Nus